Rajiv Dhall (born 1992; Cincinnati, Ohio) is an Indian American singer-songwriter, multi-instrumentalist and part-time actor. On December 18, 2010, he started uploading videos to his YouTube channel "TwentyForSeven" which had over 1,000,000 subscribers and over 120 million views.

Biography 
Rajiv Dhall was born the son of Punjabi Indian-origin father and Caucasian mother. He attended Plymouth-Canton Educational Park. While Dhall was in high school, he and his friends formed the emo-pop outfit TwentyForSeven (consisting of Dhall, (vocals/guitar), Matt Pastor (bass/keys/vocals), Blake Hayes (guitar/vocals), Tony Bastianelli (Synth/Programming) and Corey DeLuca (drums)) and spent several years fronting the band with some success.

Career 
His band appeared on E's, Opening Act competition in 2012 and as a surprise, they got a chance to be the opening act for Gym Class Heroes.

He later started uploading solo cover songs to YouTube which eventually gave him a large online following. In 2015, he released his version of the One Direction song "Just Can't Let Her Go", which entered the Top 200 of the iTunes songs chart.

After his success on YouTube, his friend Andrew Bazzi introduced him to Vine, a short-form video sharing service where users can share six-second-long looping video clips. He was nominated for "Best Vine Musician" in the Seventh Annual Shorty Awards, losing out to Shawn Mendes. He was also nominated for the 2015 MTV Woodie Awards.

In 2016, he was nominated for the 2016 iHeartRadio Much Music Video Awards in the "Fan Fave Vine Musician" category and he won.

He also made videos showcasing the top songs of 2012, 2013, 2015, 2016, 2017, 2018 and 2020.

Awards and nominations

References

External links 
 
 
 
 
 

People from Canton, Michigan
Singer-songwriters from Michigan
American male musicians of Indian descent
American musicians of Indian descent
American male singer-songwriters
American male pop singers
American pop pianists
American male pianists
American acoustic guitarists
American male bass guitarists
American pop guitarists
Living people
American Internet celebrities
Guitarists from Michigan
1992 births
21st-century American singers
21st-century American pianists
21st-century American bass guitarists
21st-century American male singers